The 1975–76 BBC2 Floodlit Trophy was the eleventh occasion on which the BBC2 Floodlit Trophy competition had been held.

St. Helens won the trophy by beating Dewsbury by the score of 22-2
The match was played at Knowsley Road, Eccleston, St Helens, Merseyside. The attendance was 3,858, and the  receipts were £1,747

Background 
This season saw no changes in the  entrants, no new members and no withdrawals, the number remaining at twenty-two.
The format was again changed slightly, in that the preliminary round as well as the remainder of the tournament was played on a knock-out basis.
The preliminary round now involved twelve clubs, to reduce the numbers taking part in the  competition proper to just sixteen.

Competition and results

Preliminary round 
Involved  6 matches and 12 clubs

Preliminary round – replays 
Involved  4 matches and the same 8 Clubs in reverse fixtures (the  other two matches were on a single leg basis)

Round 1 – first round 
Involved  8 matches and 16 clubs

Round 2 – quarter finals 
Involved 4 matches with 8 clubs

Round 3 – semi-finals  
Involved 2 matches and 4 clubs

Final

Teams and scorers 

Scoring - Try = three (3) points - Goal = two (2) points - Drop goal = two (2) points

The road to success 
This tree excludes any preliminary round fixtures

Notes and comments 
1 * Dewsbury, who joined the competition in season 1973–74, win their first game in the  competition
2 * This match was televised
3 * The Rothmans Rugby League Yearbook 1990-1991 and 1991-92  and the RUGBYLEAGUEprojects gives the  attendance as 3,858 but theofficial St. Helens archives give it as 3,850
4  * Knowsley Road was the home of St Helens R.F.C. from 1890 until its closure in 2010. The final capacity was 17,500 although the record attendance was 35,695 set on 26 December 1949 for a league game between St Helens and Wigan.

General information for those unfamiliar 
The Rugby League BBC2 Floodlit Trophy was a knock-out competition sponsored by the BBC and between rugby league clubs, entrance to which was conditional upon the club having floodlights. Most matches were played on an evening, and those of which the second half was televised, were played on a Tuesday evening.
Despite the competition being named as 'Floodlit', many matches took place during the afternoons and not under floodlights, and several of the entrants, including  Barrow and Bramley did not have adequate lighting. And, when in 1973, due to the world oil crisis, the government restricted the use of floodlights in sport, all the matches, including the Trophy final, had to be played in the afternoon rather than at night.
The Rugby League season always (until the onset of "Summer Rugby" in 1996) ran from around August-time through to around May-time and this competition always took place early in the season, in the Autumn, with the final taking place in December (The only exception to this was when disruption of the fixture list was caused by inclement weather)

See also 
1975–76 Northern Rugby Football League season
1975 Lancashire Cup
1975 Yorkshire Cup
BBC2 Floodlit Trophy
Rugby league county cups

References

External links
Saints Heritage Society
1896–97 Northern Rugby Football Union season at wigan.rlfans.com 
Hull&Proud Fixtures & Results 1896/1897
Widnes Vikings - One team, one passion Season In Review - 1896-97
The Northern Union at warringtonwolves.org
Huddersfield R L Heritage

BBC2 Floodlit Trophy
BBC2 Floodlit Trophy